Mariana "Moro" Anghileri (born April 14, 1977) is an Argentine television and film actress.

Born in Junín, Buenos Aires, she first starred in the slice-of-life film, Sábado (2001), and has since worked in numerous roles for television and the cinema of Argentina. She earned a Silver Condor Award for her starring role in the tragic Buena Vida Delivery (2004).

Filmography
 Sábado (2001)  Saturday
 Nadar solo (2003)
 Vida en Marte (2003)
 Si no me ahogo (2004)
 Good Life Delivery (2004)
 Lifting de corazón (2005)
 Side Walls (2005)
 Ronda nocturna (2005) a.k.a. Night Watch
 A los ojos de Dios (2005)
 Aballay (2010)
 The Corporation (2012)
 El muerto cuenta su historia (2016)
 Mi mejor amigo (2018)

Television
 Sangre fría (2004) (mini TV Series)
 Sin crédito (2005) (mini TV Series)
 Flor do Caribe (2013) (Brazilian soap opera )

Awards
Wins
 Argentine Film Critics Association Awards: Silver Condor; Best New Actress, for: Buena Vida Delivery; 2005.

References

External links
 
 
 

1977 births
Living people
People from Buenos Aires Province
Argentine people of Italian descent
Argentine television personalities
Women television personalities
Argentine film actresses